Long Xuyên is the capital city of An Giang province, in the Mekong Delta region of south-western Vietnam.

History

In 1789, a group of explorers established a small outpost in the Tam Khe canal, naming it Dong Xuyen.  Sooner after a marketplace was created and named Long Xuyen, but by the 1860s the area become more well known by the Long Xuyen market than the official outpost's name. From 1877, the reach of Long Xuyen grew as the city's administration become responsible for an increasing number of neighborhoods and wards.  It would not be until 1999 would Long Xuyen be designated as a formal city.

Geography
It is located approximately 1,950 km south of Hanoi, 189 km from Ho Chi Minh City, and 45 km from the Cambodian border. The population of Long Xuyên city is over 368,376 (2013), with an area of approximately 106.87 km².

The city is subdivided to 13 commune-level subdivisions, including the wards of: Mỹ Bình, Mỹ Long, Mỹ Xuyên, Bình Khánh, Mỹ Phước, Đông Xuyên, Mỹ Quý, Mỹ Thạnh, Mỹ Thới, Bình Đức, Mỹ Hòa and the rural communes of Mỹ Hòa Hưng and Mỹ Khánh.

Economy

As a major urban hub within the rural Mekong River Delta region, Long Xuyen is adjacent to major agricultural operations.  With a major docking station in the middle of the city and rivers cutting throughout its landscape, the city connects the residents of the provinces of An Giang, Dong Thap, and Kien Giang province to the region's land-based infrastructure.

With farms in towns surrounding the city connected by roads and canals, Long Xuyen (and its Quadrilateral Region) serves as a major conduit for producers of a number of commodities, with jasmine rice and basa fish being the two most well-known. The proliferation of irrigation canals in the city has provided a major boon to the region's economy, but also poses a threat to environmental protection and community safety.

Education
Long Xuyên is home to An Giang University and the Long Xuyên Teacher's Training College. An Giang University is the second largest university in the Mekong Delta with over 10,000 students enrolled in 2021.

There are three main high schools in Long Xuyên city: Thoại Ngọc Hầu, Bình Khánh and Long Xuyên. Thoại Ngọc Hầu high school was once known as Long Xuyên high school, with currently over 2,000 students. Thoại Ngọc Hầu is a specialized school for majors of English, Mathematics, Chemistry, Physics, Literature, and Biology.

Culture 
As Long Xuyen was designated as a city until 1999, many of its residents have moved from surrounding rural towns.  The Long Xuyen Floating Market is an aspect of the more traditional life that remains from more rural life.

With its close proximity to Cambodia, the city has a significant number of Khmer residents.

Religion

Long Xuyên has a rich religious make-up.  It is founding place of the Hòa Hảo Buddhist sect. There are also many Catholic churches and communities, with the Long Xuyen Diocese celebrating its 60th anniversary with 230,000 members in 2020. It is one of few cities with a Cao Dai temple.

Former president Tôn Đức Thắng's birthday is celebrated in Mỹ Hòa Hưng (Tiger Island).

Cuisine
With its proximity to Cambodian border to the north, the coastline of the Indian Ocean to the west, and the Mekong River dissecting surrounding towns, the cuisine of Long Xuyen is heavily influenced by both local goods as well as products passing through.  More locally,   basa fish, mắm thái, and thot not coconuts are considered locally produced ingredients. Bun Ca Long Xuyen is a distinct specialty to the city that can be found by street vendors, who make a broth with snakehead fish and tamarind to eat with rice noodles and herbs.

Sports
Long Xuyen is home to An Giang Football Club (Câu lạc bộ bóng đá An Giang) which plays in the V.League 2, the second tier of Vietnamese professional soccer.

Notable residents
Nguyễn Ngọc Thơ, vice-president of the Republic of Vietnam (before April 30, 1975)
Tôn Đức Thắng, senior Communist Party leader, President of the Democratic Republic of Vietnam (North Vietnam); later became the first President of the Socialist Republic of Vietnam
Võ Tòng Xuân, agronomist and former rector of An Giang University
Vương Trung Hiếu, writer
Tạ Minh Tâm, singer
Ba Cụt, Hòa Hảo warlord

Notable locales

References

External links 
 

Cities in Vietnam
Districts of An Giang province
An Giang province
 
Populated places in An Giang province
Provincial capitals in Vietnam